J. Gordon Island is an uninhabited island in Qikiqtaaluk Region, Nunavut, Canada. It is one of 24 islands that make up the Ottawa Islands, situated in the eastern portion of Hudson Bay.

Other islands in the vicinity include Booth Island, Bronson Island, Eddy Island, Gilmour Island, Pattee Island, and Perley Island.

References

Islands of Hudson Bay
Uninhabited islands of Qikiqtaaluk Region